Mason A. Diaz (born May 16, 2000) is an American professional stock car racing driver. He competes for Ferrier-McClure Racing, driving their No. 44 Toyota part-time in the ARCA Menards Series East and part-time in the ARCA Menards Series.

Racing career

Starting at age four in go-karts, Diaz ran at Dominion Speedway in both Champ Car and Bandolero entries until age twelve. He later moved up to Legends car racing and late model racing, eventually running in the Pro All-Stars Series (PASS) during his late model days. He later started racing frequently at Southern National Motorsports Park.

Diaz made his first and to-date only NASCAR Camping World Truck Series start in 2017 at Martinsville, driving the No. 86 Chevrolet Silverado for driver Brandon Brown's Brandonbilt Motorsports team. He started 9th and finished 23rd.

Diaz made his Xfinity Series debut at Richmond's fall race in 2018, driving for Brandonbilt Motorsports in the No. 90 car, using owner points from DGM Racing. He would run three more races for Brown's team the following year in their own No. 68 and 86 cars.

In 2019, when Diaz was racing at the 2019 Snowflake 100 at Five Flags Speedway, he was approached by a representative from Venturini Motorsports, and the two initially agreed to a deal that would have put Diaz in the team's No. 20 Toyota in the ARCA Menards Series in the races that Chandler Smith was ineligible to drive in. However, this deal was later changed to have him run the full season in the ARCA Menards Series East instead.

Diaz continued racing in the now-ARCA Menards Series East in 2020, where he finished fifth in points with a best finish of third at Dover International Speedway, with additional starts coming in the ARCA Menards Series West. He returned to the Xfinity Series in late October when he joined Sam Hunt Racing for the final two races of the season at Martinsville Speedway and Phoenix Raceway.

On January 19, 2021, it was announced that Diaz would be leaving Venturini and joining Visconti Motorsports, driving their No. 74 car full-time, with it being Diaz's second full-time season in the East Series.

Personal life
Diaz attends Old Dominion University.

Motorsports career results

NASCAR
(key) (Bold – Pole position awarded by qualifying time. Italics – Pole position earned by points standings or practice time. * – Most laps led.)

Xfinity Series

Camping World Truck Series

ARCA Menards Series

ARCA Menards Series East

 Season still in progress 
 Ineligible for series points

ARCA Menards Series West

References

External links
 

living people
2000 births
NASCAR drivers
Racing drivers from Virginia
People from Manassas, Virginia